"I Know the End" is a song by American singer-songwriter Phoebe Bridgers. It was released on July 29, 2020 as the fourth single from her second studio album, Punisher (2020). The song is a "three-part suite" that talks about depression, euphoria, and the apocalypse that culminates in a cathartic scream. It has been described as chamber pop, though Bridgers describes it as a "big metal song". Several of Bridgers' frequent collaborators are featured on the song, including Boygenius bandmates Lucy Dacus and Julien Baker, Better Oblivion Community Center bandmate Conor Oberst, and Copycat Killer producer Rob Moose.

Music video
The song's Alissa Torvinen-directed official music video was released on July 29, 2020. It features Bridgers "as she navigates dark corridors, emerges from a tub of water, and discovers a locker room full of skeleton onesies." This leads to "an epic finale" at the empty Los Angeles Memorial Coliseum, where she has a screaming match with an older woman, who she kisses. The abstract style recalls Wes Anderson and David Lynch as Bridgers' grapples with her own mental health.

Live performances
The song made its live debut on September 10, 2020, with a virtual performance on NPR Tiny Desk, where Bridgers performed in a fake Oval Office set. Later in the month she performed the song on CBS This Morning and Late Night with Seth Meyers. The latter performance was filmed as one continuous shot in an empty theater in Covina, California. She performed the song as her Saturday Night Live on February 6, 2021, a performance she ended by smashing her guitar on a prop stage monitor.

Critical reception
"I Know the End" received acclaim from music commentators, with many highlighting the song's emotional resonance and themes.  It was referred to as the best song of the year by Vulture, with the website saying "The final seconds of "I Know the End" are spent on Bridgers a capella, gasping for more air to scream with—only to choke on it. Frankly, I can't think of a better metaphor for 2020." A review for Pitchfork said that it "packs an album's worth of ideas into five minutes and 45 seconds. One moment the Punisher closer is a hushed acoustic ballad, the next it's a swelling mid-tempo strummer, and then it explodes into an orchestral fanfare, and each section has its own emotional arc". A review for NME called it "an epic cacophony; musing on the apocalypse while boasting the singer’s delicate, calm and reflective side before blossoming into the biggest thing she's ever done". A Consequence of Sound review read "The ominous ballad returns to the singer-songwriter's narrative abilities and chronicles a bleak look at the world in step with references to American culture and recent happenings through orchestrated folk hymns and electric guitar."

Year-end lists

Personnel 

 Julien Baker – vocals
 Phoebe Bridgers – lead vocals, baritone electric guitar
 Lucy Dacus – vocals
 Lukas Frank – vocals
 Ethan Gruska – sound design, synthesizers, Mellotron, Optigan flutes
 Christian Lee Hutson – vocals
 Jenny Lee Lindberg – bass
 Malcolm McRae – vocals
 Rob Moose – strings
 Conor Oberst – vocals
 Emily Retsas – bass
 Kane Ritchotte – vocals
 Tomberlin – vocals
 Marshall Vore – drums, percussion, vocals
 Jeroen Vrijhoef – vocals
 Nathaniel Walcott – horns
 Nick White – piano, Mellotron
 Nick Zinner – electric guitar

References

2020 singles
2020 songs
Apocalyptic music
Phoebe Bridgers songs
Songs about depression
Songs written by Phoebe Bridgers
Songs written by Conor Oberst
2020s ballads
Dead Oceans singles